Government Associate College Phool Nagar is located in  Phool Nagar, Punjab, Pakistan. It was established on 1 September 1974 and offers courses in mathematics, sciences, computer science, languages and history. A library was established in the college on 1 September 1989. The college was nationalized during the government of Pakistan Prime Minister Zulfikar Ali Bhutto.

Principal and vice principal
The current principal of the college is Rao Abdul Waheed Tabish (2017 to onwards). The vice principal is Abdul Ghani.

Departments
Following is the details of departments in Govt. Degree College Phool Nagar.
Department Of Mathematics

CTI

Department Of Statistics

Professor Mudassar Hussain (M.Phil Statistics)

Department Of Chemistry

Professor Usman Arshad (M.Phil Chemistry)

Department Of Biology

CTI

Department Of Physics

Professor Munir Ahmed (M.Phil Physics)

Department Of Psychology

Professor Abdul Waheed Tabish (M.Phil Psychology)

Department Of Islamiat

Professor Muhammad Zikriya M.Phil(Islamiat), PhD Scholar, MA(Education), MA(Arabic)

Dr.Muhammad Mansha Tayyab Ph.D Islamic Studies ,M.A (Arabic)

Department Of Urdu

Professor Rao Akbar Ali M.Phil(Urdu)

Department Of Education

CTI

Department Of English

Professor Habibullah
Naveed Ahmed

Department Of History

Professor Saleem Akhtar MA(Political Science)

Department Of Political Science

CTI

Department Of Sociology

CTI

Department Of Arabic

Professor Dr. Hafiz Abdul Ghani PhD(Islamiat)

Department Of Physical Education

Ali Yousaf

Department Of Economics

Professor Atif Javaid Rao M.Phil(Economics)

Professor Fahad Iqbal MA(Economics)

Department Of Library Science

Janaab Zahid Nawab MA(Library Science)

Teaching Subjects For Examination Of Intermediate
Compulsory Subjects:-

1- Urdu 2- English 3-Islamiat(Compulsory) 4- Pakistan Studies

Elective Subjects:-

Pre-Medical Group:-

1- Chemistry 2- Physics 3- Biology

Pre-Engineering Group

1- Chemistry 2- Physics 3- Mathematic

ICS

You have to select one of the following groups

G-1 Physics, Computer Science, Mathematic

G-2 Economics, Computer Science, Mathematic

G-3 Statistics, Computer Science, Mathematic

General Science Group:-

You have to select one of the following groups

G-1 Economica, Statistics, Mathematics

G-2 Physics, Statistics, Mathematics

I.Com:-

Accounting, Principle of Economics, Principle of Commerce, Business Math

Humanities Group:-

You have to select one of the following groups

G-1 Psychology, Sociology, Economics, History of Pakistan

G-2 Physical Education, Civics, Education

G-3 Library Science, Arabic, Islamiyat (Elective)

See also

Superior Group of Colleges
Punjab Group of Colleges

References
https://m.facebook.com/pages/category/Education/Government-Degree-College-for-Boys-Phool-Nagar-Kasur-949829955165596/
https://www.google.com/maps/place/Govt+Boys+College+Phool+Nagar,+Lahore,+Kasur,+Punjab,+Pakistan/@31.2158845,73.9357567,15z/data=!4m2!3m1!1s0x39185c7603b0b351:0x95f8b2703f6fc526?gl=pk

Schools in Punjab, Pakistan